Adiposis dolorosa is an outdated term for many years used synonymously as Dercum's disease, lipedema or Anders disease. While there are numerous references to adiposis dolorosa, it is recommended that the term no longer be used. Dercum's is now recognized as a separate condition, as is lipedema. Adiposis dolorosa, also known as Dercum's disease, is a rare condition characterized by painful, fatty deposits that develop mainly on the trunk, upper arms, and thighs.

References

Endocrine diseases
Conditions of the subcutaneous fat
Rare diseases
Diseases of veins, lymphatic vessels and lymph nodes
Medical controversies